1941–42 Cairo League, the 21st Cairo League competition, Ahly won the competition for 12 time.

League table 

 (C)= Champions, Pld = Matches played; W = Matches won; D = Matches drawn; L = Matches lost; F = Goals for; A = Goals against; ± = Goal difference; Pts = Points Source: .

Matches

References

External links 
 http://www.angelfire.com/ak/EgyptianSports/CairoZone194142.html

1941–42 in Egyptian football
Cairo League
1941–42 domestic association football leagues